Hank J. "Henry" Harper (February 21, 1929 – August 5, 1957) was a Canadian sprint canoeist who competed in the late 1940s. At the 1948 Summer Olympics in London, he finished seventh in the K-2 1000 m and 14th in the K-2 10000 m event. After returning from the Olympics, Harper joined the police force in his hometown of Gananoque, Ontario, and later the Ontario Provincial Police. He died in 1957 after being hit by a motorist while directing traffic around an accident. He was 28 years old.

References

1929 births
1957 deaths
Canadian male canoeists
Canoeists at the 1948 Summer Olympics
Olympic canoeists of Canada
Ontario Provincial Police officers
Accidental deaths in Ontario
Road incident deaths in Canada
20th-century Canadian people